Tjunti is a soakage site near Kaḻṯukatjara, in the Northern Territory  of  Australia. Tjunti is known as the site where the famous gold prospector Harold B. Lasseter took refuge on his fatal search for Lasseter's Reef. An outstation was established here in 1977, and belongs to a Pitjantjatjara family.

The gap in the mountains is formed here by the Hull River, a sandy creek that remains dry for most of the year. It splits the Curdie Range in the south from the Mannanana Range in the north. There are several soaks and rockholes in the area.

Lasseter's Cave 

This is an opening in a rock formation in the Mannanana Range. Lasseter took shelter here for about 25 days during January 1931, when trying to find a rich gold deposit that he claimed to have discovered in the area on an earlier expedition. His camels had deserted him, and he was stranded in the bush without food. While taking shelter in the cave, Lasseter recorded his account of his journey, including the days spent in the cave.

References

External links
 Tjunti in the Northern Territory's Place Names Register

Caves of the Northern Territory
Landforms of the Northern Territory
Populated places established in 1977
Aboriginal communities in the Northern Territory
Waterholes of Australia
Bodies of water of the Northern Territory